Salem Hill may refer to:

Salem Hill (band)
Salem Hill, New Jersey